Jacqueline Guest  is a Métis writer and activist from Alberta, Canada. Guest is a literacy advocate and a writers of books for children and young adults. In 2017 she was inducted into the Order of Canada.

Selected works

Lorimer Sports Stories

Historical fiction

PathFinders series

Sam Stellar Mystery series

Tourond series

Other

Notes

References

External links

Living people
Year of birth missing (living people)
21st-century Canadian women writers
Canadian women children's writers
Canadian writers of young adult literature
Members of the Order of Canada
Métis writers